U.S. Route 190 (US 190) is an east–west United States Highway in Louisiana and Texas. Segments of US 190 will be upgraded to Interstate 14 (I-14); the first  segment was opened on January 26, 2017.

Route description

|-
|TX
|
|-
|LA
|
|-
|Total
|
|}

Texas

It runs east through Texas Hill Country speckled with sagebrush, intersecting with State Highway 305 (SH 305), crossing into Schleicher County, and intersecting with US 277 in Eldorado.  US 190 continues east into Menard County, intersecting State Highway 864, and passing a few miles north of Fort McKavett State Historic Site, entering Menard and intersecting with US 83 north a short distance.

Continuing on a northeastward route, US 190 enters McCulloch County and into Brady. As the closest city to the geographical center of Texas, the city proclaims itself the "True Heart of Texas", "where five major highways meet, making it a major gateway to all regions of the state". US 190 enters Brady from the south merging and running concurrently with north US 377 and US 87 through town, intersecting Farm to Market Road 2028 (FM 2028), FM 2309, then splitting with US 87 and US 377, before exiting the city heading east. US 190 goes through Rochelle, enters San Saba County, through Richland Springs where it intersects FM 45, the communities Algerita, and Harkeyville, and into San Saba, the birthplace of actor Tommy Lee Jones, and an intersection with SH 16. Continuing east US 190 enters Lampasas County, entering Lometa, merging and running concurrently with US 183 south into the city of Lampasas. Splitting from US 183 and continuing east, US 190 runs through Kempner and into the extreme southern corner of Coryell County and Copperas Cove, which is located on the southwestern edge of Fort Hood. On the east side of Copperas Cove, a concurrency with I-14 begins. US 190 then traverses through part of Fort Hood, into Bell County and Killeen. Being directly adjacent to the main cantonment of Fort Hood, both Killeen and Copperas Cove depend on the fort and those stationed there.

US 190 next intersects and merges with I-35 through Belton and enters Temple, where I-14 ends. The highway then merges and runs concurrently with SH 36 south. Continuing east and south, US 190 passes through Rogers and enters Milam County then Cameron and merges with US 77 south for a distance. A few miles south of Cameron, US 190 merges and runs concurrently with US 79 north. In Hearne, US 190 splits with US 79 and merges to run concurrently with SH 6 south, entering Brazos County, through Benchley, and into Bryan, that is considered the heart of the Brazos Valley (Southeast Central Texas), and is part of the Bryan-College Station metropolitan area.

US 190 splits with SH 6, turning northeast and merging with SH 21 north, entering Kurten, entering Madison County also passing through North Zulch, Cottonwood and into Madisonville, before merging with I-45 south and into Walker County, then entering Huntsville, where US 190 splits heading into Eastern Texas.

Continuing east, US 190 enters San Jacinto County, Texas, passing north of Oakhurst and Point Blank, crossing Lake Livingston, entering Polk County and into Onalaska. US 190 from the west makes a semi-loop up over Lake Livingston and down to Livingston, intersecting US 59 and Business US 59 (Bus. US 59) and through Alabama-Coushatta Indian Reservation, entering Tyler County, merging with FM 256 and into Woodville. East of Woodville, FM 256 splits north and US 190 crosses BA Steinhagen Lake, into Jasper County, intersecting with SH 63 east, and in the center of Jasper intersecting with US 96. Continuing east, US 190 travels through Holly Springs and enters Newton County, proceeding into Newton. In Newton, US 190 turns south through Bon Wier, and then crosses the Louisiana line. In Newton County, US 190 has been designated one of the routes on the Great Texas Coastal Birding Trail.

Louisiana

Merryville is the location of the old Coushatta Indian village.

From Merryville the highway heads north by northeast to the community of Junction, Louisiana, also referred to as "The Junction". Junction is where Louisiana Highway 111 (LA 111) and US 190 intersect and is the site of a roadside marker and the joining of two Indian trails.

From Junction, US 190 heads east to DeRidder, where it runs concurrently with US 171 south and passes several sites on the National Register of Historic Places, such as the Beauregard Parish Jail, Beauregard Parish Courthouse, and the DeRidder Commercial Historic District. US 190 runs concurrently with US 171 to Ragley, where US 190 parts with US 171 heading east. From Ragley, the two-lane highway heads nearly due east almost parallel to I-10 until Opelousas. US 190 crosses the northern reach of the Atchafalaya Basin near the Morganza Spillway en route to Baton Rouge. From Baton Rouge, US 190 passes, in places divided, through Denham Springs, Albany, Hammond, Robert, Goodbee, Covington, Mandeville, before reaching the eastern terminus at Slidell.

The stretch between I-12 south of Covington and the intersection with LA 22 at Mandeville is multilane divided with controlled access, serving as the primary connector between I-12 and the north end of the Lake Pontchartrain Causeway. The highway's eastern terminus is in the bayous near Slidell, at an intersection with US 90. This junction was once known as the "White Kitchen" after a restaurant that was once located there.

Other designations
 Atchafalaya Expressway — US 190 in Louisiana
 Earl Rudder Freeway and Central Texas Expressway — US 190 in Texas (part of future I-14)

History
In the original 1926 plan, US 190 served the purpose of modern-day I-12 as the road around the north side of Lake Pontchartrain to avoid New Orleans. The original western terminus was in Baton Rouge, Louisiana, meeting US 71 at the Baton Rouge–Port Allen ferry across the Mississippi River. US 190 was concurrent with State Route 7 (SR 7, in the pre-1955 Louisiana Highway system) from Baton Rouge to Covington, then SR 34 from Covington to Slidell, Louisiana. The original eastern terminus of US 190 was in Slidell, where it intersected US 90/LA 2 (now US 11).

In 1935, the route was extended west across the Mississippi River, ending in the western Texas town of Brady at an intersection with US 87. The section from Krotz Springs to the Baton Rouge-Port Allen ferry was a concurrency with US 71 from 1935 until 1951.

US 190 now ran westward to I-10 outside of Iraan, replacing a section of Ranch to Market Road 33 (RM 33) and all of both FM 1257 and FM 1980.

Louisiana
The original 1926 route followed the Jefferson Highway through downtown Baton Rouge, then LA 426 (Old Hammond Highway) to the Amite River. East of Baton Rouge, significant differences from the current alignment are as follows: LA 1032 through Denham Springs; LA 1027 into Walker; LA 43 and 1040 (Old Baton Rouge Highway) between Albany and Hammond; South Range Road and LA 1067 (Old Covington Highway) between Hammond and the Tangipahoa River; and Bus. US 190 through Covington.

West of Baton Rouge, the current alignment generally follows the same route since its extension into Texas in 1935. The only major re-routing was between Deridder and Elton, where the original route followed LA 26. The portion between Oberlin and Elton was re-routed in 1937 to follow US 165 to Kinder before assuming the current alignment between Deridder and Kinder the following year. Other differences from the current route are as follows: LA 110 through Merryville; LA 3099 into DeRidder; LA 3253, 1244, 31, and 742 between Opelousas and Port Barre; Old U.S. 190 between Bayou Courtableau and Krotz Springs and between East Krotz Springs, Louisiana Krotz Springs and Lottie; LA 77 between Livonia and Rosedale; and LA 76 between Rosedale and Port Allen.

In 1937, US 190 took over the original route of US 90 from Slidell to the Rigolets Bridge (along current US 11 and LA 433) when that highway assumed its current routing into Mississippi. US 190 was given its current eastern terminus at US 90 in the 1940s, following what is now Bus. US 190 (Fremaux Avenue) through Slidell until the 1970s when it was shifted onto Gause Boulevard.

In 1951, US 190 was re-routed along Bus. US 51 (mainline US 51 at the time) and LA 22 between Hammond and Mandeville. The new route passed through Ponchatoula and Madisonville and bypassed Covington. The former route through Covington was restored in 1956.

The current US 190 near Krotz Springs is an elevated highway. The road was built as a bypass around the road called Old 190 which continues across the Morganza Spillway to the western edge of Lottie. US 190 crosses the Atchafalaya River on two cantilever bridges known as the Krotz Springs Bridge. It crosses the Mississippi River on the 1940-era Huey Long Bridge north of Baton Rouge.

The route is now used as an alternate route for I-10, across the Atchafalaya Expressway. Traffic can be diverted along LA 975 to Krotz Springs, and LA 76 to US 190/LA 1.

Future 
Interstate 14 is likely to extend further west and east in central Texas along the US 190 corridor, once adequate funding becomes available. In 2019, Representative Brian Babin (R-TX) introduced legislation in the House of Representatives to extend the I-14 corridor through Odessa, many parts of which would likely follow the US 190 alignment through parts of central Texas. Though the bill was referred to the Congressional Subcommittee on Highways and Transit, it is likely that bills featuring a congressional I-14 designation will be proposed in the future, as the Fixing America's Surface Transportation Act initially authorized I-14.

The Texas Department of Transportation will upgrade US 190 from a two-lane highway to a four-lane divided highway from approximately two miles (3.2 km) south of Heidenheimer, Texas to the Bell County-Milam County line. The $77.8 million project will improve driving safety along 7.3 miles of US 190 in central Texas, as  new hardened medians will separate each side of traffic. This continues previously completed upgrades along US 190 of two-lane to four-lane highways. The most recent of these improvements were made to the Heidenheimer area circa 2010.

Junction list

Business routes 
US 190 has six business routes: three in Texas and three in Louisiana.

Copperas Cove 
Business U.S. Highway 190-E is a 4.5 mile (7.2 km) long business route that runs through downtown Copperas Cove. In 2010, the Texas Department of Transportation was given approval by the American Association of State Highway and Transportation Officials (AASHTO) to move US 190 to a new bypass on the south side of Copperas Cove, leaving the original alignment to be made into a business route. The project had been in the planning phases since the 1980s. After delays due to the construction of what would become I-14 to the east of Copperas Cove, the $46.5 million bypass opened on January 29, 2015, and the original alignment became Business US 190.

Business US 190's western terminus is located at a signaled intersection with US 190 and Farm to Market Road 2657 (FM 2657). Though signed east–west, the first section of the road runs north-to-northeast toward the city center of Copperas Cove. Turning east after, the road intersects FM 116, where FM 116 forms a short concurrency with Business US 190 for three blocks. After the concurrency, FM 116 breaks off and continues north towards downtown. Continuing eastward, the road intersects northbound FM 1113 and begins to enter the commercial district of Copperas Cove. The road continues due east past the town's center until it merges with I-14, US 190, and State Highway 9 (SH 9). There is no direct access from eastbound Business US 190 to westbound I-14/US 190 or SH 9.

Killeen 
Business U.S. Highway 190-F is a 9.09 mile (14.6 km) long business route that runs through downtown Killeen that follows an old alignment of US 190. When US 190 was moved off the original route to a southern bypass around both Killeen and the town of Harker Heights in 1975, the remaining route was initially declared as State Loop 518. In an overhaul of state loop designations throughout Texas, however, the Texas Department of Transportation converted many former U.S. route and state highway alignments into business routes, thus creating Business U.S. Highway 190.

Business US 190 begins at a partial cloverleaf interchange with I-14/US 190 and Hood Road. This interchange is located within the boundaries of Fort Hood; the only access to the army base directly from US 190 Business is via Hood Road. The route continues east as Veterans Memorial Boulevard. It intersects State Highway 195 (Fort Hood Road) as the business route exits Fort Hood and enters Killeen city limits. The business route passes through downtown Killeen and crosses FM 439 once passing the commercial district. Continuing eastward, the route passes by Skylar Field Airport and enters Harker Heights, where it intersects both FM 3423 and FM 3219. Approaching US 190, the business route splits: according to the Texas Department of Transportation, the official west-to-east alignment of the route forks to Edwards Drive, while the east-to-west alignment continues on Veterans Memorial Boulevard, though both directions are signed as the business route on the boulevard. At either designation, the roads both lost the designation at their respective I-14/US 190 intersections.

Heidenheimer 
Business U.S. Highway 190-J is a 2.5 mile (4.0 km) long business route that runs through the town of Heidenheimer along an old alignment of US 190. As US 190 has come to be a major thoroughfare through central Texas, traffic could not handle the two lane road in the primarily residential area. With houses on both sides of the road close to the roadway, a bypass was needed by the mid-2000's. A new four-lane bypass around Heidenheimer looped west around the town, opening in 2010. In October 2010, the AASHTO approved the movement of US 190 to the new bypass. Later in 2010, the Texas Department of Transportation requested AASHTO to also approve the new Business U.S. Highway 190, which had been signed by Texas since US 190's movement. The highway has been subsequently approved and the business route continues to be signed as such.

Though more aligned north-to-south, the business route is signed west-to-east. It begins at a T-intersection with US 190 westbound. The entrance to Business US 190 is not accessible from the eastbound lanes of US 190 as a grass median divides the highway. Once on the business route, it turns almost immediately to the right and begins a southeasterly track towards the town of Heidenheimer. Another access road from US 190 allows eastbound traffic to turn onto the business route. This connector is signed as 'TO BUSINESS US 190' from the mainline road. Continuing eastward, the road intersects FM 93 at its eastern terminus, also allowing access to US 190. Entering the main residential part of the small town, the eastern terminus of FM 436 intersects Business US 190. Only slightly further east is Business US 190's eastern terminus, where traffic returns to US 190.

Baton Rouge 

U.S. Highway 61/190 Business, also called Florida Boulevard and internally designated as U.S. Highway 61-X, is a 10.8 mile (17.4 km) business route that runs along the old alignment of both US 61 and US 190 through downtown Baton Rouge. Although US 190 is signed as a west-to-east route, US 61/190 Business generally does not have directional signage and changes directions multiple times.

From southeast to northwest, the business route begins at a cloverleaf interchange with both US 190, which continues east toward Hammond, and US 61, which continues south toward New Orleans. Both mainline routes come together to form a concurrency and continue northward along the Airline Highway, while the continuing road from US 190 becomes the business route. The route continues west through a primarily commercial area and past Baton Rouge Community College before entering downtown Baton Rouge. I-110 northbound has a direct exit to US 61/190 Business (Exit 1C) in downtown Baton Rouge, while southbound motorists must use N. 9th Street (Exit 1G) to connect directly to the business route. US 61/190 Business continues west through downtown until it reaches River Road where it turns right and continues north.

Moving north, the business route passes one block to the left of the Louisiana State Capitol and along the Mississippi River before merging onto N. 3rd Street and entering an industrial area. The road curves and becomes Chippewa Street where it now heads east toward I-110. At US 61/190 Business' intersection with Louisiana State Highway 3164, the route turns to the left onto Scenic Highway, now heading north again, running parallel to I-110. The route continues about 2.5 miles (4 km) before reaching its northern terminus at US 61/190. At this point, Scenic Highway is taken over by US 61, now heading north towards Natchez and US 190 continues westward towards Opelousas.

Although US 61/190 Business has been signed as such since 1960, it did not formally get approval from the American Association of State Highway Officials (AASHO) until 1968.

Covington 

U.S. Highway 190 Business, also known as 21st Avenue or Boston Street and internally known as U.S. Highway 190-X, is a 3.31 mile (5.33 km) long business route that runs on the old alignment of US 190 through Covington.

The road begins at an intersection with US 190 to the west of downtown Covington. The business route continues eastbound into downtown Covington until it reaches Louisiana Highway 21 (LA 21). From here, LA 21 begins to run concurrently with US 190 Business until it returns to US 190 on the east side of Covington. The route was approved by AASHO in June 1969, along with the US 190 rerouting.

Slidell 
U.S. Highway 190 Business, also known as Fremaux Avenue and internally known as U.S. Highway 190-Y, is a 3.94 mile (6.34 km) long business route that runs on most of the old alignment of US 190 through Slidell. The road begins at the intersection of US 11 (Front Street) and Fremaux Avenue in the 'Olde Towne' neighborhood of Slidell. The business route continues eastbound on Fremaux Avenue until it ends at US 190 (Military Road), where US 190 turns eastbound once again and takes over Fremaux Avenue.

When I-10 was constructed in Slidell in the 1960s, the proximity of a weigh station could not allow an exit to be built at then-US 190. Nearby Gause Road (then Louisiana Highway 1092), which paralleled the former US 190, was chosen as the I-10 exit in Slidell. After increased traffic on Gause Road and motorist confusion accessing US 190, the state of Louisiana petitioned AASHO to re-route the highway and create a new business route. At AASHO's June 1971 meeting, this request was approved. US 190 was permanently routed onto the now widened Gause Boulevard and Military Road while US 190 Business was signed along the former routing by 1975.

Following Hurricane Katrina in 2005, the weigh station on I-10 near the US 190 Business overpass was permanently closed and razed. In 2006, the Louisiana Department of Transportation and Development (LaDOTD) began construction on a new interchange at US 190 Business at the request of the St. Tammany Parish government and the City of Slidell. Extensive traffic backups at the US 190 (Gause Boulevard) interchange and the planning of a new retail center prompted this to be one of many projects to revitalize the area following Hurricane Katrina. Originally scheduled to open in the spring of 2008, multiple instances of severe weather, the threat of Hurricane Gustav, and signage delays pushed the opening of the interchange to late September 2008.

Although approved to sign the business route concurrently with US 11 to US 190 in 'Olde Towne' Slidell, the route officially begins at US 11.

See also

Notes

References

External links

Endpoints of US highway 190

1
United States Numbered Highway System
90-1
90-1
U.S. Route 190
U.S. Route 190
U.S. Route 190
U.S. Route 190
U.S. Route 190
U.S. Route 190
U.S. Route 190
U.S. Route 190
U.S. Route 190
U.S. Route 190
U.S. Route 190
U.S. Route 190
U.S. Route 190
U.S. Route 190
U.S. Route 190
U.S. Route 190
U.S. Route 190
U.S. Route 190
U.S. Route 190
U.S. Route 190
U.S. Route 190
U.S. Route 190
U.S. Route 190
U.S. Route 190
U.S. Route 190
U.S. Route 190
U.S. Route 190
U.S. Route 190
U.S. Route 190
U.S. Route 190
U.S. Route 190